The men's doubles tournament of the 2014 Copenhagen World Championships (World Badminton Championships) took place from August 25 to 31. Hendra Setiawan and Muhammad Ahsan enter the competition as the current champions.

Seeds

  Muhammad Ahsan / Hendra Setiawan (withdrew)
  Lee Yong-dae / Yoo Yeon-seong (final)
  Mathias Boe / Carsten Mogensen (semifinals)
  Hiroyuki Endo / Kenichi Hayakawa (third round)
  Kim Ki-jung / Kim Sa-rang (semifinals)
  Lee Sheng-mu / Tsai Chia-hsin (quarterfinals)
  Hoon Thien How / Tan Wee Kiong (quarterfinals)
  Liu Xiaolong / Qiu Zihan (quarterfinals)

  Markus Fernaldi Gideon / Markis Kido (third round)
  Koo Kien Keat / Tan Boon Heong (third round)
  Angga Pratama / Rian Agung Saputro (quarterfinals)
  Ko Sung-hyun / Shin Baek-cheol (champion)
  Chai Biao / Hong Wei (third round)
  Chris Adcock / Andrew Ellis (second round)
  Hirokatsu Hashimoto / Noriyasu Hirata (second round)
  Maneepong Jongjit / Nipitphon Puangpuapech (second round)

Draw

Finals

Section 1

Section 2

Section 3

Section 4

References
BWF Website

2014 BWF World Championships